Virtual Organization for Innovative Conceptual Engineering Design (VOICED) is a virtual organization that promotes innovation in engineering design. This project is the collaborative work of researchers at five universities across the United States, and is funded by the National Science Foundation. The goal of this virtual organization is to facilitate the sharing of design information between often geographically dispersed engineers and designers through the use of a robust and sophisticated design repository. Additionally, functional data can be mapped to historical failure data and possible components to create a conceptual design.

The end goal is to turn VOICED into a tool that allows engineers to create conceptual designs based on archived designs and detect failures in those design through an open design repository (Tumer & Stone, n.d.). VOICED is a fairly new organization, being about 3–4 years old, however the concepts that underlie the organization have been under development for much longer.

Universities
Oregon State University
Missouri University of Science and Technology (team has moved to Oregon State)
Penn State
University of Texas
Texas A&M University

NSF Awards
Collaborative Research: VOICED - A Virtual Organization for Innovative Conceptual Engineering Design 
 0742677 & 0742698

Software
Design Engineering Lab
 Design Repository
FunctionCAD is an open source application used for the visual representation of functional models.
SKDB - "apt for hardware", see also open source hardware.

See also
Open design

References

External links
http://www.p2pfoundation.net/VOICED

Engineering organizations